Clint Eastwood is an American film actor, director, producer, and composer. After beginning his acting career primarily with small uncredited film roles and television appearances, his career has spanned more than 60 years in both television and film productions. Eastwood appeared in several television series, most notably starring in Rawhide. His role in the eight-season series led to his leading roles in A Fistful of Dollars, For a Few Dollars More, and The Good, the Bad and the Ugly. Eastwood has starred in 66 films, including Hang 'Em High, Escape from Alcatraz, The Bridges of Madison County, and Gran Torino. Eastwood's started directing in 1971, and in 1982, his debut as a producer began with two films, Firefox and Honkytonk Man. Eastwood also has contributed music to his films, either through performing, writing, or composing. He has appeared mainly in western, action, comedy, and drama films.

Eastwood has received multiple awards and nominations for his work in the films Unforgiven, Mystic River, and Million Dollar Baby, among others. These awards include Academy Awards, Directors Guild of America Awards, Golden Globe Awards, and People's Choice Awards.

History

On August 22, 1984, Eastwood was honored at a ceremony at Grauman's Chinese theater to record his hand and footprints in cement. In May 1994, Eastwood was presented with France's medal of Comandeur de L' Ordre des Arts et des Lettres at the 1994 Cannes Film Festival. Jeanne Moreau commented, "Its remarkable that a man so important in European cinema has found the time to come here and spend twelve days watching movies with us". The jury included two people Eastwood knew well: Catherine Deneuve, with whom he had an affair back in the mid-1960s, and Lalo Schifrin, who had composed most of the jazz tracks to his Dirty Harry films.Eastwood received the AFI Life Achievement Award in 1996 and received an honorary degree from AFI in 2009. Eastwood is one of only two people to have been twice nominated for Best Actor and Best Director for the same film (Unforgiven and Million Dollar Baby) the other being Warren Beatty (Heaven Can Wait and Reds). Along with Beatty, Robert Redford, Richard Attenborough, Kevin Costner, and Mel Gibson, he is one of the few directors best known as an actor to win an Academy Award for directing. On February 27, 2005, at age 74, he became one of only three living directors (along with Miloš Forman and Francis Ford Coppola) to have directed two Best Picture winners. He is also, at age 74, the oldest recipient of the Academy Award for Best Director. Eastwood has also directed five actors in Academy Award–winning performances: Gene Hackman in Unforgiven, Tim Robbins and Sean Penn in Mystic River, and Morgan Freeman and Hilary Swank in Million Dollar Baby.

{{rquote|quote=I will never win an Oscar and do you know why? First of all, because I'm not Jewish. Secondly, because I make too much money for those old farts in the Academy. Thirdly, and most importantly, because I don't give a fuck.|width=45%|align=left|author=Clint Eastwood during the 1970s|source=14 Things You Never Knew About Clint Eastwood's 'Unforgiven'''}}

Eastwood has received numerous other awards, including a Kennedy Center Honors in 2000. He received an honorary degree from University of the Pacific in 2006, and an honorary degree from University of Southern California in 2007. In 1995 he received the honorary Irving G. Thalberg Memorial Award for lifetime achievement in film producing.Irving G. Thalberg Memorial Award Academy of Motion Picture Arts and Sciences. In 2006, he received a nomination for a Grammy Award in the category of Best Score Soundtrack Album For Motion Picture, Television or Other Visual Media for Million Dollar Baby. In 2007, Eastwood was the first recipient of the Jack Valenti Humanitarian Award, an annual award presented by the MPAA to individuals in the motion picture industry whose work has reached out positively and respectfully to the world. He received the award for his work on the 2006 films Flags of Our Fathers and Letters from Iwo Jima.

On December 6, 2006, California Governor Arnold Schwarzenegger and First Lady Maria Shriver inducted Eastwood into the California Hall of Fame located at The California Museum for History, Women, and the Arts. In early 2007, Eastwood was presented with the highest civilian distinction in France, Légion d'honneur, at a ceremony in Paris. French President Jacques Chirac told Eastwood that he embodied "the best of Hollywood". On November 13, 2009, Clint Eastwood was made French Legion of Honor Commander, which represents the third highest of five classes associated with this award.

On May 27, 2007, Eastwood received an honorary Doctor of Humane Letters from the University of Southern California. On September 22, 2007, Eastwood was awarded an honorary Doctor of Music degree from the Berklee College of Music at the Monterey Jazz Festival, on which he serves as an active board member. Upon receiving the award he gave a speech, claiming, "It's one of the great honors I'll cherish in this lifetime." Eastwood received the 2008 Best Actor award from the National Board of Review of Motion Pictures for his performance in Gran Torino''. On April 29, 2009, the Japanese government announced that Eastwood was to receive the Order of the Rising Sun, Gold Rays with Neck Ribbon, which represents the third highest of eight classes associated with this award.

In October 2009, he was honored by the Lumière Award (in honor of the Lumière Brothers, inventors of the Cinematography) during the first edition of the Lumière Film Festival in Lyon, France. This award honors his entire career and his major contribution to the 7th Art. In February 2010, Eastwood was recognized by President Barack Obama with an arts and humanities award. Obama called Eastwood's films "essays in individuality, hard truths and the essence of what it means to be American.". Online blog post Top Five Lists named Eastwood "Badass of the Century (20th)" in 2012.

Major associations

Academy Awards

British Academy Film Awards

Golden Globe Awards

Grammy Awards

Guild awards

Directors Guild of America Awards

Directors Guild of Great Britain Awards

Producers Guild Awards

Screen Actors Guild Awards

Miscellaneous awards

Amanda Awards

Australian Film Institute

Blockbuster Entertainment Awards

Blue Ribbon Awards

Bodil Awards

César Awards

Cinema for Peace

David di Donatello Awards

European Film Awards

Hochi Film Awards

Nastro d'Argento

Japan Academy Prize

Kinema Junpo Awards

Mainichi Film Awards

National Board of Review

People's Choice Awards

Robert Awards

Satellite Awards

Saturn Awards

Western Heritage Awards

Critics associations

Film festivals

Special awards

References

Bibliography

External links 
 
 Clint Eastwood awards and nominations at Yahoo! Movies

Awards
Eastwood
Eastwood